Grand River Collegiate Institute is a public secondary school in Kitchener, Ontario. The school is located at 175 Indian Road. It is part of the Waterloo Region District School Board. As of November 2017, there are approximately 1250 full-time students and 130 staff.

History
As the fifth collegiate in Kitchener-Waterloo, Grand River Collegiate (GRCI) was built on Indian Road near the Grand River in Kitchener's eastern area.  "Grand River" was chosen in favour of other names like 'Parkwood' or 'Sand Hills', as the name for the new school. GRCI officially opened on September 6, 1966, with about 850 students and 55 teachers.

Grand River Collegiate Institute has had seven principals:
Ross L. Shaver (1966 to 1984)
Gary A. Boug (1984 to 1995)
Ray Teed (1996 to Jan 2008)
Agnes Dufournaud (Feb 2008 to Aug 2009)
Scott Lomax (Aug 2009 to Jan 2011)
Deborah Tyrrell (Feb 2011 to June 2017)
Jim Woolley (July 2017 to Oct. 2018)
Josh Windsor (Oct. 2018 - Present)

Athletics
Grand River has athletic groups which include: alpine skiing, archery, badminton, basketball, cross-country, curling, dance, field hockey, football, ice hockey, Nordic skiing, power lifting, rugby, soccer, swimming, tennis, track & field and volleyball. Grand River's sports teams are known as the Renegades (commonly shortened to the "Rens").

Notable alumni
 Chelsea Aubry, Olympic Basketball player
 Riley Damiani NHL hockey player, Dallas Stars
 Dana Ellis, Olympic Pole Vaulter 
 Jill Hennessy, actress
 Mike Hoffman, NHL Hockey player, Ottawa Senators
 Jamal Murray, Basketball player, Kentucky Wildcats, Denver Nuggets
 Mark Scheifele, NHL Hockey player, Winnipeg Jets
 Kelly VanderBeek, Olympic Alpine Skier
Jenny Heijun Wills, author

See also
List of high schools in Ontario

References

Waterloo Region District School Board
High schools in the Regional Municipality of Waterloo
Educational institutions established in 1966
Schools in Kitchener, Ontario
Modernist architecture in Canada
1966 establishments in Ontario